The Sierra campaign or Breña campaign  was the last phase of the land campaigns of the War of the Pacific. This stage begins after the occupation of Lima, in February 1881, and extends until the consolidation of the Treaty of Ancón, between October and November 1883, which ends the war, with favorable conditions for Chile.

See also 
 Asymmetric warfare

Bibliography
 
 
 
 

War of the Pacific
Wars involving Chile
Wars involving Peru
19th century in Chile
19th century in Peru
Conflicts in 1881
Conflicts in 1882
Conflicts in 1883